Telêmaco Borba Airport - Monte Alegre Airport , formerly SBTL is the airport serving Telêmaco Borba, Brazil.

It is operated by Indústrias Klabin S/A under the supervision of Aeroportos do Paraná (SEIL).

Airlines and destinations

Access

See also

List of airports in Brazil

References

External links

Airports in Paraná (state)
Telêmaco Borba